Mehar may refer to
 Mehar (name)
 Mehar Taluka, an administrative subdivision in Pakistan
Jhok Mehar Shah, a village in Pakistan
Mehar Shah railway station in Mehar Shah village, Punjab, Pakistan
Kotla Mehar Singh Wala, a village in Punjab, India
Sohni Mehar, a Punjabi folktale
Mehar Bano aur Shah Bano, a Pakistani TV drama which aired in 2012